Old Fort Bliss are a pair of two-story adobe buildings in El Paso, Texas. They were built in the 1850s, and designed in the Victorian architectural style. They were army barracks and later remodelled into apartment buildings. The structure has been listed on the National Register of Historic Places since February 23, 1972. In 2017, the structure was endangered.

References

Adobe buildings and structures
Buildings and structures completed in 1851
Buildings and structures in El Paso, Texas
National Register of Historic Places in El Paso County, Texas
Victorian architecture in Texas
Fort Bliss
Barracks on the National Register of Historic Places